Nannophya pygmaea, known variously as the scarlet dwarf, northern pygmyfly, or tiny dragonfly, is a dragonfly of the family Libellulidae, native from Southeast Asia to China and Japan, occasionally found south to Australia.

Description
This species has the distinction of being the smallest of the dragonflies, with a wingspan of only .

References

External links
Scarlet dwarf at ARCBC
Northern pygmyfly at CSIRO
Scarlet dwarf at bjbug.com

Libellulidae
Odonata of Asia
Insects of Indonesia
Insects of Southeast Asia
Taxa named by Jules Pierre Rambur
Insects described in 1842